"Death Avenue" was a nickname given to both Tenth and Eleventh Avenues on the west side of Manhattan, New York City in the 19th century.

In 1847, the City of New York authorized the construction of railroad tracks along Tenth and Eleventh Avenues on Manhattan's West Side. The street-level tracks were used by the New York Central Railroad's freight trains, which shipped commodities such as coal, dairy products and beef. For safety the railroad hired "West Side cowboys", men who rode horses and waved flags in front of the trains. However, so many accidents occurred between freight trains and other traffic that the nickname "Death Avenue" was given to Tenth and Eleventh Avenues. In 1910, one organization estimated that there had been 548 deaths and 1,574 injuries over the years along Eleventh Avenue.

Public debate about the hazard began during the early 1900s. In 1929 the city, the state, and New York Central agreed on the West Side Improvement Project, conceived by Robert Moses. The  project eliminated 105 street-level railroad crossings and added  to Riverside Park; it also included construction of the West Side Elevated Highway and the West Side Line elevated viaduct. It cost more than $150 million, about $2 billion in 2017 dollars. The last stretch of street-level track was removed from Eleventh Avenue in 1941.

References

Chelsea, Manhattan
Hell's Kitchen, Manhattan
West Side Line
19th century in Manhattan